The Kəpəz 2012–13 season was Kəpəz's third Azerbaijan Premier League season since their promotion back into the top flight. Kapaz started the season under Fuad Ismayilov, but he resigned on August 19, being replaced by Mahmud Gurbanov. Kəpəz finished the season in 12th place, getting relegated to the Azerbaijan First Division for the 2013-14 season, after being bottom of the league for all bar two weeks. They also participated in the 2012–13 Azerbaijan Cup, winning their first-round game against Qala 2-4, before losing to Qarabağ in extra time in the second round.

Squad

Transfers

Summer

In:

Out:

Winter

In:

Out:

Competitions

Azerbaijan Premier League

Results summary

Results by round

Results

League table

Azerbaijan Premier League Relegation Group

Results summary

Results by round

Results

Table

Azerbaijan Cup

Squad statistics

Appearances and goals

|-
|colspan="14"|Players who appeared for Kəpəz no longer at the club:

|}

Goal scorers

Disciplinary record

References

Kepez
Kapaz PFK seasons